Ehretia anacua is medium-sized tree found in eastern Mexico and southern Texas in the United States. It is a member of the borage family, Boraginaceae.  One of its common names, anacua, is derived from the Mexican Spanish word anacahuite, as is that of the related Cordia boissieri, the anacahuita.  That word in turn is derived from the Nahuatl words āmatl, meaning "paper," and cuahuitl, meaning "tree," possibly referring to the bark. It is also known as knockaway, a corruption of anacua, and sandpaper tree. Alternate spellings are anaqua and anachua.

Description
The bark is reddish-brown to gray with narrow furrows and peeling scales. Their upper surfaces are remarkably rough, feeling like low-grade sandpaper. Anacua is a partial evergreen, replacing some of the leaves in early spring. Abundant white flowers form in panicles or cymes  in length at the ends of twigs, making trees appear to be covered in snow when in bloom from spring to summer. The fruits are spherical drupes 8 mm in diameter and yellowish-orange. The drupes contain two stones, each with two seeds. In addition to being edible by humans, the drupes are eaten by mammals and birds such as the clay-colored thrush. The lifespan of an Anacua is at least 50 years.

Habitat
Anacua is found on dry hillsides as a shrub, but reaches tree size in the moist soils of riparian zones and floodplains.

Ecology
The leaves of E. anacua are the sole food source of the Texas tortoise beetle (Coptocycla texana).

References

External links

anacua
Trees of Mexico
Trees of the South-Central United States
Trees of Chiapas
Trees of Coahuila
Trees of Hidalgo (state)
Trees of Nuevo León
Trees of Querétaro
Trees of San Luis Potosí
Trees of Tamaulipas
Trees of Veracruz
Flora of Texas
Plants described in 1924